Thomas Breithweite, D.D., sometime Rector of Stepney; was Archdeacon of Chester from  his installation on 11 March 1797 until his death on 29 December 1800.

References

18th-century English Anglican priests
Archdeacons of Chester
1800 deaths
Alumni of Brasenose College, Oxford